Einari Arvid Vuorela (17 August 1889, in Keuruu – 10 July 1972, in Helsinki) was a Finnish writer. He was born in the village Jukojärvi in a family of 10 children, and started his studies at Multia. He became a teacher in Jyväskylä in 1914. His wife from 1939 was writer Laura Soinne. Finnish composer Heidi Sundblad-Halme set several of his poems to music.

He won the Eino Leino Prize in 1966.

Books
Puut ajattelevat (1967)
Kiurun portaat (1971)
Siintää himmeyden metsät (1975)
Täältä kaukana (1927)
Kullanhuuhtoja (1934)

References

Other webpages
Einari Vuorela 

1889 births
1972 deaths
People from Keuruu
People from Vaasa Province (Grand Duchy of Finland)
Writers from Central Finland
Finnish writers
Recipients of the Eino Leino Prize